Van is an unincorporated community in Polk County, in the U.S. state of Missouri.

History
A post office called Van was established in 1899, and remained in operation until 1934. The community has the name of Van Burnes, the son of the original owner of the site.

References

Unincorporated communities in Polk County, Missouri
Unincorporated communities in Missouri